The Ambassador Extraordinary and Plenipotentiary of the Russian Federation to the Republic of the Union of Myanmar is the official representative of the President and the Government of the Russian Federation to the President and the Government of Myanmar.

The ambassador and his staff work at large in the Embassy of Russia in Yangon.

History of diplomatic relations

Diplomatic relations between the Soviet Union and what was then known as Burma were first established on 28 February 1948, with an agreement to exchange ambassadors. The first Soviet ambassador, was appointed on 4 October 1950, and presented his credentials on 21 May 1951. Following the dissolution of the Soviet Union in 1991, the incumbent Soviet ambassador, continued as representative of the Russian Federation until 1992.

List of representatives (1950 – present)

Representatives of the Soviet Union to Burma (1950 – 1991)

Representatives of the Russian Federation to Myanmar (1991 – present)

References

 
Myanmar
Russia